Marcelo Arévalo and Miguel Ángel Reyes-Varela were the defending champions but chose not to defend their title.

Guillermo Durán and Roberto Quiroz won the title after defeating Thiago Monteiro and Fabrício Neis 6–3, 6–2 in the final.

Seeds

Draw

References
 Main Draw

Challenger Ciudad de Guayaquil - Doubles
2018 Doubles